= Charlie Chaplin bibliography =

A list of books and essays about Charlie Chaplin:

- Chaplin, Charlie (1 January 2005). Charlie Chaplin: Interviews. Univ. Press of Mississippi. ISBN 978-1-57806-702-2.
- Kamin, Dan (5 September 2008). The Comedy of Charlie Chaplin: Artistry in Motion. Scarecrow Press. ISBN 978-0-8108-7781-8.
- Lynn, Kenneth Schuyler (1997). Charlie Chaplin and His Times. Simon & Schuster. ISBN 978-0-684-80851-2.
- Neibaur, James L. (2012). Early Charlie Chaplin: The Artist as Apprentice at Keystone Studios. Scarecrow Press. ISBN 978-0-8108-8242-3.
